Wildside  is an American series aired by ABC from March to April 1985. The series stars William Smith, J. Eddie Peck, Howard Rollins, Sandy McPeak, Terry Funk, John D'Aquino, and Meg Ryan.

The series aired for six episodes, from March 21 to April 25, 1985.

Plot 
Five outlaws once roamed the U.S. Western territories. The leader and organizer was J. Wendell Summerhayes, while the other members were Brodie Hollister, Varges de la Cosa, Bannister Sparks, and Prometheus Jones. The five outlaws went straight and Summerhayes became the governor of California. The other four men became businessmen in the town of Wildside, CA, and form the "Chamber of Commerce." Brodie's son Sutton was raised in the East by Brodie's wife but traveled to Wildside to be with his father. Although Wildside is normally peaceful, trouble inevitably arises either when criminals come to town or when Summerhayes appeal to his former gang members for help. When their services are needed, the five men don their weapons and go on a "hunting party" to deal with the problem.

The series was produced by Touchstone Television, a then-new division of Walt Disney Productions. Although it featured several shootouts and fistfights per episode, there were very few on-screen deaths. Much of the violence was presented in a stylized and bloodless manner, similar to that of The A-Team.

Characters

Reception and cancellation
Wildside was aired as a mid-season replacement and put on Thursday nights against the popular The Cosby Show. Due to low ratings, the series was canceled after one month.

Episodes

Season 1

References

External links
 

1985 American television series debuts
1985 American television series endings
American Broadcasting Company original programming
English-language television shows
Television series by ABC Studios
Television shows set in California
1980s Western (genre) television series